Kim Kwang-min (Korean: 김광민; born 16 August 1962) is a North Korean football coach and former player who played as a defender. He participated with his selection in the final phase of the 1992 Asian Nations Cup, scoring two goals. He is a former coach of the North Korean women's football team.

Biography

Kim Kwang-min was born in Pyongyang on 16 August 1962.

Very little is known about Kim's is youth club career at the North Korean championship.

He applied to the North Korean national team in 1985, where he participated in the qualifying campaigns for three World Cups in 1986, 1990 and 1994. He was called for the first time on 19 January 1985 to face Singapore

In 1987, he won the title of athletic athlete in recognition of his achievement in winning the DPR Korea team at the 1987 Kings Cup in Thailand.

In 1990, he was part of the North Korean group that participated in the inaugural edition of the Dynasty Cup, which became from 2003 the East Asian Football Cup.

Kim really shows up in the Asian finals as he scores the only two goals in his selection in three games. In 1992, he first opened the scoring against the host country, Japan who manages to equalize ten minutes from the end of the match at the 1992 AFC Asian Cup. It also marks the first goal of the game against the United Arab Emirates, who finally win two goals to one.

Kim scores another goal in the final round of the World Cup qualifiers, against Iraq, who beat 3–2, for what remains the Chollimas' only victory in this final qualifying stage, which they complete. in the last place. He also scored a goal in a friendly match won against Bolivia 2–1 at the 1993 Nehru Cup.

Since 2007, he is the head coach of the North Korean women's team, which he leads in the final stages of the 2007 World Cup in China and 2011 in Germany. The North Koreans reach the quarter-finals at the 2007 edition, the best result achieved by the selection in the World Cup. They also won the 2008 AFC Women's Asian Cup and is on the North Korean bench at the 2008 Summer Olympics football tournament Beijing.

References

1962 births
Living people
North Korean footballers
North Korea international footballers
1992 AFC Asian Cup players
North Korean football managers
Association football defenders
North Korea women's national football team managers
2007 FIFA Women's World Cup managers
2011 FIFA Women's World Cup managers
Asian Games medalists in football
Footballers at the 1990 Asian Games
Asian Games silver medalists for North Korea
Medalists at the 1990 Asian Games